Santa Maria Futebol Clube (abbreviated as Santa Maria FC) is a Portuguese football club based in Galegos (Santa Maria), Barcelos in the district of Braga.

Background
Santa Maria FC currently plays in the Campeonato Nacional de Seniores Série A which is the third tier of Portuguese football. The club was founded in 1943 and they play their home matches at the Estádio da Devesas in Galegos (Santa Maria), Barcelos.

The club is affiliated to Associação de Futebol de Braga and has competed in the AF Braga Taça.  The club has also entered the national cup competition known as Taça de Portugal on occasions.

Season to season

Honours
AF Braga Divisão de Honra: 1996/97, 2008/09
AF Braga Primeira Divisão: 1984/85
AF Braga Taça: 1984/85, 2001/02, 2008/09

Notable former players

Footnotes

External links
Veterans website 

Football clubs in Portugal
Association football clubs established in 1943
1943 establishments in Portugal